The 39th Golden Globe Awards, honoring the best in film and television for 1981, were held on January 30, 1982.

Winners and nominees

Film 

The following films received multiple nominations:

The following films received multiple wins:

Television

The following programs received multiple nominations:

The following programs received multiple wins:

Ceremony

Miss Golden Globe 
Laura Dern (daughter of Bruce Dern & Diane Ladd)

See also
54th Academy Awards
2nd Golden Raspberry Awards
33rd Primetime Emmy Awards
34th Primetime Emmy Awards
 35th British Academy Film Awards
 36th Tony Awards
 1981 in film
 1981 in American television

References
IMdb 1982 Golden Globe Awards

039
1981 film awards
1981 television awards
January 1982 events in the United States
1981 awards in the United States